The Science Subcommittee on Energy is one of five subcommittees of the United States House Committee on Science, Space and Technology.

In 2007, the subcommittee held the first Congressional hearing on global climate change for the 110th Congress. The Hearing on the State of Climate Change Science 2007: The Findings of the Fourth Assessment Report by the Intergovernmental Panel on Climate Change (IPCC), Working Group I Report, included four climate scientists who authored the Intergovernmental Panel on Climate Change (IPCC) assessment report and Speaker Nancy Pelosi.

Jurisdiction 

Legislative jurisdiction and general oversight and investigative authority on all matters relating to energy research, development, and demonstration and projects therefor, commercial application of energy technology, and environmental research including:

Department of Energy research, development, and demonstration programs;
Department of Energy laboratories;
Department of Energy science activities;
energy supply activities;
nuclear, solar and renewable energy, and other advanced energy technologies;
uranium supply and enrichment, and Department of Energy waste management and environment, safety, and health activities as appropriate;
fossil energy research and development;
clean coal technology;
energy conservation research and development;
energy aspects of climate change;
pipeline research, development, and demonstration projects;
energy and environmental standards;
energy conservation including building performance, alternate fuels for and improved efficiency of vehicles, distributed power systems, and industrial process improvements;
Environmental Protection Agency research and development programs;
National Oceanic and Atmospheric Administration, including all activities related to weather, weather services, climate, and the atmosphere, and marine fisheries, and oceanic research;
risk assessment activities; and
scientific issues related to environmental policy, including climate change.

History 

Chairs of the subcommittee:
 Judy Biggert (R), Illinois, 2005–2007
 Nick Lampson (D), Texas, 2007–2009
 Brian Baird (D), Washington, 2009–2011
 Andy Harris (R), Maryland, 2011–2013
 Cynthia Lummis (R), Wyoming, 2013–2015
 Randy Weber (R), Texas, 2015–2019
 Conor Lamb (D), Pennsylvania, 2019-2020
 Lizzie Fletcher (D), Texas, 2020-2021
 Jamaal Bowman (D), New York, 2021-present

Members, 117th Congress

Historical membership rosters

115th Congress

116th Congress

External links
 Subcommittee on Energy, official website
 Republican Subcommittee website

Science Energy
Science and technology in the United States